In Greek mythology, Mariandynus (Ancient Greek: Μαριανδυνός) was the eponymous hero of the Mariandyni tribe in Northern Anatolia. He was an Aeolian, a son of either Cimmerius, or Phrixus, or Phineus (and in the latter case, brother of Thynus). He had several sons, of whom the eldest may have been Titias.

Mariandynus was also the name of his grandson through Titias, who was credited with composing a mourning song in honor of his brother Priolaus, killed in a battle against the Bebrycians.

Notes

Reference 

 Stephanus of Byzantium, Stephani Byzantii Ethnicorum quae supersunt, edited by August Meineike (1790-1870), published 1849. A few entries from this important ancient handbook of place names have been translated by Brady Kiesling. Online version at the Topos Text Project.

Characters in Greek mythology
Greek mythology of Anatolia